The white-lored oriole (Oriolus albiloris) is a species of bird in the family Oriolidae.

It is endemic to Luzon island (Philippines). Some authorities have considered the white-lored oriole to be a subspecies of the Philippine oriole.

References

white-lored oriole
Birds of Luzon
white-lored oriole
Taxonomy articles created by Polbot